Mini World is the debut studio album by French singer and songwriter Indila. It was released on 24 February 2014 by Capitol Music France.

Background 
The album is produced by the French producer, Skalp, who had already produced songs that Indila was featured in. The album was released on 24 February 2014.

Track listing

All songs written by Adila Sedraïa, and produced by Pascal "Skalp" Koeu.

Charts

Weekly charts

Year-end charts

Certifications

Release history

References 

2014 debut albums
French-language albums
European Border Breakers Award-winning albums